The Sekiu River is a  long river in the U.S. state of Washington. The mouth of the river empties into Puget Sound from the Olympic Peninsula in Clallam County. The river has an additional  of tributaries connected to it.

The mouth of the Sekiu river is used to define the western border of North Puget Sound.

See also
List of rivers of Washington

References

Rivers of Washington (state)
Rivers of Clallam County, Washington